Dušan Salatić (born 3 March 1929) is a Serbian professor and writer. He was born in Nova Crvenka, Kingdom of Yugoslavia (now Serbia). He was the party leader of the now defunct Savez Srba Vojvodine.

References

Sources

External links 
САЛАТИЋ ДУШАН, редовни члан АИНС од 2000. године

1929 births
Living people
20th-century Serbian people
Serbian writers
People from Kula, Serbia
Serbian politicians